Lieutenant-General Lord George Beauclerk (26 December 1704 – 11 May 1768) was a British Army officer, the sixth son of Charles Beauclerk, 1st Duke of St Albans by his wife Diana, daughter of Aubrey de Vere, 20th Earl of Oxford.

Military career
Beauclerk served in the 1st Regiment of Foot Guards, and was promoted to captain and lieutenant-colonel in September 1736. In 1745 he was nominated aide-de-camp to King George II with the rank of colonel, and in 1747 he obtained the colonelcy of the 8th Regiment of Marines (afterwards disbanded), from which he was removed on 15 March 1748 to the 19th Regiment of Foot. In 1753 he was appointed Governor of Landguard Fort, holding the post until his death. He was promoted to the rank of major-general in 1755, to that of lieutenant-general in 1758 and performed the duties of Commander-in-Chief in Scotland from 1756 to 1767.

Political career
He was Member of Parliament for New Windsor from 1744 to 1754. He was elected again for New Windsor in the 1768 election but died the day after Parliament met.

Family
Beauclerk married Margaret Bainbridge, daughter of Thomas Bainbridge of Slaley, Northumberland.

References
 R. S. Lea, BEAUCLERK, Lord George (1704-68). in The History of Parliament: the House of Commons 1715-1754 (1970).
 Mary M. Drummond, BEAUCLERK, Lord George (1704-68). in The History of Parliament: the House of Commons 1754-1790 (1964).
This article incorporates text from a publication now in the public domain: Richard Cannon, Historical Record of the Nineteenth, or First Yorkshire North Riding Regiment of Foot (London, 1848) pages 36–37.

|-

1704 births
1768 deaths
Younger sons of dukes
British Army lieutenant generals
11th Hussars officers
Coldstream Guards officers
Members of the Parliament of Great Britain for English constituencies
British MPs 1741–1747
British MPs 1747–1754
British MPs 1768–1774
George